James Rickey Calhoun (born May 30, 1963) is a former American football running back in the National Football League who played for the Los Angeles Raiders. He played college football for the Cal State Fullerton Titans.

References

1963 births
Living people
American football running backs
American football return specialists
Los Angeles Raiders players
Cal State Fullerton Titans football players
Players of American football from Montgomery, Alabama
National Football League replacement players